Living Church or Renovationism was a schism in the Russian Orthodox Church from 1922 to 1946.

Living Church may also refer to:
 The Living Church, a periodical about the Episcopal Church in the United States of America
 Living Church of God, a Christian denomination founded in 1998 in the U.S.